"Back in the U.S.S.R." is a 1968 song by the Beatles.

Back in the USSR may also refer to:

 Back in the USSR (album), or CHOBA B CCCP, a 1988 album by Paul McCartney
 Back in the USSR (film), a 1992 American thriller film